Boebe or Boibe (ancient Greek: Βοίβη) may refer to:

Boebe (Crete), a town of ancient Crete, Greece
Boebe (Thessaly), a town of ancient Thessaly, Greece
Boebeis Lake, a lake of ancient Thessaly, Greece